Elena Brioukhovets and Natalia Medvedeva were the defending champions, but they did not compete this year.

Rika Hiraki and Florencia Labat won the title by defeating Sabine Appelmans and Camille Benjamin 6–3, 6–3 in the final.

Seeds

Draw

Draw

References

External links
 Official results archive (ITF)
 Official results archive (WTA)

Puerto Rico Open (tennis)
1991 WTA Tour